Erroll is an English male given name or surname that is synonymous to Earl. Notable people with the name include:

Earl of Erroll, Scottish title
Erroll M. Brown (born 1950), first USCG African-American admiral
Erroll Collins (1906–1991), British author
Erroll Fraser (1950–2002), ice speed skater
Erroll Garner (1923–1977), American jazz musician
Erroll Chunder Sen (c. 1899 – after 1941), Indian pilot in the Royal Flying Corps during the First World War
Frederick Erroll, 1st Baron Erroll of Hale (1914–2000), British Conservative politician

See also
Errol (disambiguation)
Erol, a Turkish male given name